The Euganean Hills are a group of hills of volcanic origin that rise to heights of 300 to 600 m from the Padovan-Venetian plain a few km south of Padua. The Colli Euganei form the first Regional park established in the Veneto (1989), enclosing fifteen towns and eighty one hills.

History
The name memorializes that of the Euganei, an ancient people who inhabited the region upon contact with the Romans.

The Euganean Hills were formed in a sub-marine outwelling of basaltic lava during the Eocene, which was followed in the Oligocene by an episode of activity characterized by viscous magma, which formed deposits of trachyte.

The Euganean Hills, just visible from Venice, have been celebrated for their picturesque beauty and their hot springs. In the Euganean Hills, at Arquà, Petrarch found peace and harmony towards the end of his life, and the town now bears his name attached to it. He discovered the village in 1369; there, he stated in his letter to posterity, "I have built me a house, small, but pleasant and decent, in the midst of slopes clothed with vines and olives,"—a house that may be seen there today. The Euganean hills, like an archipelago of steep-sided wooded islands rising from the perfectly flat agricultural plain, inspired the setting of Percy Bysshe Shelley's Lines Written Among the Euganean Hills. Shelley likens the hill he has found himself upon, at first to an island in "the deep wide sea of Misery", then he sees that:

Beneath is spread like a green sea	 
The waveless plain of Lombardy,	 
Bounded by the vaporous air,	 
Islanded by cities fair—
This brings his thoughts to Venice "thou hast been/Ocean's child, and then his queen;/Now is come a darker day," and finally to a wish for an idyllic retreat.

The Euganean Hills Regional Park

The Parco Regionale dei Colli Euganei  was established in 1989 by the Veneto Region. It covers an area of about 18,000 hectares. The park offers a wide choice of recreational, natural world, historical and tourist activities.

Mountains and Hills
Monte Venda - 
Monte Rua - 
Monte Rusta - 
Monte Cinto - 
Monte Ceva - 
Monte Cecilia -

Communes of the Euganean Hills
 Abano Terme
 Arquà Petrarca
 Baone
 Battaglia Terme
 Cervarese Santa Croce
 Cinto Euganeo
 Este
 Galzignano Terme
 Lozzo Atestino
 Monselice
 Montegrotto Terme
 Rovolon
 Teolo
 Torreglia
 Vò

Wines of the Colli Euganei
Thirteen wineries have grouped together under the recently established Colli Euganei denomination.

References

 Parco Regionale Colli Euganei, official site
Euganean Hills - Regional Park of Veneto
 Tourism and territory of the Euganean Hills
Percy Bysshe Shelley, "Lines written among the Euganean hills, North italy" (e-text)
"Two poets and the Euganean Hills"

Hills of Italy
Volcanoes of Italy
Paleogene volcanism